Designed by and constructed between 1865 and 1867, The Grand Pier, also known as Teignmouth Pier, is a pier in the town of Teignmouth, Devon, England that measures  in length.

History
A total of 89 piers were built in England and Wales between 1814 and 1910 of which only 50 are still standing. Teignmouth Pier was built in 1865 by Joseph Wilson, an engineering consultant from London.

Initially, the pier was a landing stage; its purpose was to enable steamboat passengers to get to the shore.

In March 1870, a petition to wind up the Teignmouth Pier Company Limited was published in The London Gazette.

The pier is constructed of cast-iron screw piles, screwed into the sand with a large hexagon on the pile. They are screwed down to the clay level. New steel piling has been driven 80ft right to bedrock. The deck is open and made up of wood from the Yellow Balou, a hard wood from Borneo.  The deck was only recently renewed.

During the Second World War, a 60–foot section of deck was removed so that the Germans could not breach if they invaded England.  Nearly all the piers on the East and South coasts were dealt with in the same way. Compensation was paid out for replacement of that section but many remained in that state for a considerable period. The Grand was not brought to its original width until the early 1960s.

References

External links
https://www.teignmouthpier.com
https://www.facebook.com/Teignmouth-Pier-2009934352603273/
https://www.twitter.com/@TeignmouthPier
Engineering Timelines information on pier
Video footage of the Grand Pier at Teignmouth

Piers in Devon
Tourist attractions in Devon
Teignmouth